Haniffia flavescens is a monocotyledonous plant species described by Y.Y.Sam and Avelinah Julius. Haniffia flavescens is part of the genus Haniffia and the family Zingiberaceae. No subspecies are listed in the Catalog of Life.

References

flavescens
Endemic flora of Peninsular Malaysia
Plants described in 2009